All Faith Church, or All Faith Protestant Episcopal Church, is a historic church located at Charlotte Hall, St. Mary's County, Maryland.  It was built between 1766 and 1769.  It is a one-story brick, laid in Flemish bond, building with a wood shingle roof.  It is one of the best examples of preserved Georgian ecclesiastical design and construction in St. Mary's County. All Faith is one of the original 30 Anglican parishes in the Province of Maryland.

It was listed on the National Register of Historic Places in 2003.

References

External links
, including photo from 1999, at Maryland Historical Trust
St. Mary's County Historic Preservation Commission: All Faith Episcopal Church entry
All Faith Episcopal Church official website

Churches on the National Register of Historic Places in Maryland
Churches in St. Mary's County, Maryland
Episcopal church buildings in Maryland
Churches completed in 1769
18th-century Episcopal church buildings
National Register of Historic Places in St. Mary's County, Maryland